Abdus Salam Talukder (4 November 1936 – 20 August 1999) was a Bangladeshi politician and lawyer. He served as the secretary general of Bangladesh Nationalist Party, the State Minister of Law and Parliamentary Affairs, Minister of Local 
Government and Rural Development and Jatiya Sangsad member from Jamalpur-4 constituency.

Early life
Talukder was born in Mulbari, Sarishabari Upazila, Jamalpur District. He graduated from Sharishabari High School. He completed his bachelor's and master's in political science from the University of Dhaka. He completed his law school in Lincoln's Inn, London and joined the Dhaka bar in 1970.

Career
In 1976, Talukder started in politics by joining the Democratic League. He was elected to the national parliament two times in 1979, and 1991.  He was made state minister of Law and Parliamentary Affairs in the cabinet of Ziaur Rahman in 1981. In 1981, he led the Bangladesh delegation to the conference of Afro-Asian Legal Consultative Committee. From 1991-1996 he served as the Minister of Local Government, Rural Development and Co-operative in the first Khaleda Zia administration. He lost 1996 parliament election to Maulana Md. Nurul Islam.

Talukder was the chairman of the parliamentary standing committee on local government, cooperative and planning ministry. After losing in the 1996 parliament election, he resigned from secretary general position of Bangladesh Nationalist Party.

References

1936 births
1999 deaths
People from Jamalpur District
University of Dhaka alumni
Bangladesh Nationalist Party politicians
General Secretaries of Bangladesh Nationalist Party
State Ministers of Law, Justice and Parliamentary Affairs
Local Government, Rural Development and Co-operatives ministers